Chiloglanis lufirae is a species of upside-down catfish endemic to the Democratic Republic of the Congo where it is found in the Lufira River drainage. This species grows to a length of  SL.

References

External links 

lufirae
Freshwater fish of Africa
Fish of the Democratic Republic of the Congo
Endemic fauna of the Democratic Republic of the Congo
Fish described in 1976
Taxonomy articles created by Polbot